Jai Parkash Ukraniis a Pakistani politician who had been a member of the National Assembly of Pakistan from August 2018 till January 2023.

Political career

He was elected to the National Assembly of Pakistan as a candidate of Pakistan Tehreek-e-Insaf (PTI) on a reserved seat for minorities in 2018 Pakistani general election.

External links

More Reading
 List of members of the 15th National Assembly of Pakistan
 List of Pakistan Tehreek-e-Insaf elected members (2013–2018)

References

Living people
Pakistan Tehreek-e-Insaf MNAs
Pakistani MNAs 2018–2023
Year of birth missing (living people)
Pakistani Hindus